The Hot Springs High School, in Hot Springs, South Dakota is a public high school serving Hot Springs and the local area, in Fall River County.  It is part of the Hot Springs School District.  The school mascot is the Bisons.

History
The first high school was built in 1894.  The school moved to a converted building of the former Black Hills College, using that from 1910 to 1924 when the building was destroyed in a fire.

1925 building
The school's current building was built in 1925, with additions in 1953 and 1959.  It was listed on the National Register of Historic Places in 1980.

It is Tudor Revival in style, and is built of reddish-tan sandstone cut into rough ashlar, with bands using lighter tones of sandstone.  The entrance has a compound Tudor arch.

References

Public high schools in South Dakota
National Register of Historic Places in South Dakota
Tudor Revival architecture in the United States
School buildings completed in 1925
Fall River County, South Dakota
1894 establishments in South Dakota